Phyllocycla breviphylla, the ringed forceptail, is a species of clubtails in the family Gomphidae. It is found in Central America and South America.

The IUCN conservation status of Phyllocycla breviphylla is "LC", least concern, with no immediate threat to the species' survival.

References

 Steinmann, Henrik / Wermuth, Heinz, and Maximilian Fischer, eds. (1997). "World Catalogue of Odonata, Volume II: Anisoptera". Das Tierreich, vol. 111, part, xiv + 636.

Further reading

 Arnett, Ross H. (2000). American Insects: A Handbook of the Insects of America North of Mexico. CRC Press.

Gomphidae
Insects described in 1975